Catrake Force is a waterfall on the River Swale in North Yorkshire, England. It is not visible from the road but is accessible via a campsite in Keld.

It lies just upstream of Keld, downstream from Wain Wath Force. The next waterfall downstream is Kisdon Force. Waterfalls in the north of England are often termed Forces after the Norse word Foss which means waterfall, whilst Catrake derives from the Latin cataracta (waterfall) via Middle English.

East Gill Force
East Gill Force, a nearby waterfall on the tributary of East Gill just above its confluence with the Swale, is more obvious and accessible (being on both the Pennine Way and Coast to Coast Walk) and is often mistaken for Catrake Force.

References

Waterfalls of North Yorkshire
Swaledale